MBF Bioscience is a biotech company that develops microscopy software and hardware for bioscience research and education. MBF Bioscience’s main location is Williston, Vermont, United States, but has offices that market, sell, and supports its line of hardware and software products throughout North America, Europe, and Asia.

History 
The company was founded in 1988 as MicroBrightField,Inc by father and son, Dr. Edmund Glaser and Jack Glaser. Their goal was to develop neuroanatomical image software for the research community. To reflect their expanded range of products and mission, the company changed its name from MicroBrightField, Inc to MBF Bioscience in 2004. Now, MBF Bioscience provides solutions for stereology, neuron reconstruction, whole slide imaging, brain mapping, C. elegans tracking, and 2-photon microscopy. The company products are used in a variety of fields including stem cell research, cancer research, neuroanatomical studies, lung, kidney, reproductive, cardiac and toxicology research.

In 2021, MBF Bioscience acquired Vidrio Technologies. Vidrio Technologies is a provider of software and hardware components for laser scanning and two-photon microscopes.

Awards 

 Tibbetts Award  2013
 Best Places to Work in Vermont in 2007, 2009 and 2010.
 2007 Vermont Small Business Person of the Year – Business Administration, which was presented to co-founder Jack Glaser for his outstanding leadership related to his company’s staying power, growth, sales, innovation, and community contributions.

Offices 
MBF Bioscience's main locations are in Williston, Vermont, and Ashburn, Virginia. It also has offices sell and support its line of products in Europe (Delft, Netherlands), China and Taiwan (Shanghai, China), and Japan (Shiroi-shi, Chiba).

Products 
Neurolucida (1988): This microscope system creates and quantifies neuron reconstructions, allowing scientists to quantitatively analyze dendrites, axons, nodes, and synapses. Neuroscientists use this software for research in neurodegenerative diseases, neuropathy, memory, behavior, and ophthalmology.

Stereo Investigator (1995): Stereo Investigator is an unbiased stereology system that uses different stereological probes perform quantitative analysis of tissue specimens. Stereo Investigator used in research fields such as neuroscience, pulmonary research, cancer research, and toxicology. 

Neurolucida 360 (2015): Neurolucida 360 software automatically creates and quantifies neurons, allowing scientists to see the analyze dendrites, axons, nodes, and synapses. Neurolucida 360 works with 3D and 2D images and excels at handling very large images. Neuroscientists use this software for research in neurodegenerative diseases, neuropathy, memory, behavior, and ophthalmology.   

Biolucida (2011): Created to help share microscope images online and make image management easier for universities, medical institutions, and more. Biolucida is widely used in medical schools around the world to teach histopathology.

WormLab (2012): This software tracks the movement of C. elegans, a model organism widely used in research. WormLab is used in research fields such as neurodegeneration, genetics, aging, development, and toxicology.  

BrainMaker (2015): This software combines serial sections of whole slide images to create full resolution 3D reconstructions of the entire brain (or any organ). BrainMaker is used in cell mapping and cytoarchitectonics.  

NeuroInfo (2018): This software automatically delineates, identifies and maps brain regions into a common coordinate system, such as the Allen Mouse Brain Reference Atlas and Waxholm Rat Brain Atlas. Researchers use this software for in neurogenomics, transcriptomics, proteomics, and connectomics. 

MicroDynamix (2020): MicroDynamix is a software that allows researchers to visualize and quantify changes in dendritic spine morphology over a period of time from repeated imaging experiments.

MicroFile+ (2020): This software converts microscope image files from most commercial microscope providers into more space efficient, faster-loading JPEG2000 format and helps enrich the metadata and FAIRness of microscopy image data.

Vesselucida: This microscope system creates and quantifies vasculature reconstructions. Neuroscientists use this software for research in vasculature diseases.

Vesselucida 360 (2018): Vesselucida 360 is used to reconstruct vessels and microvasculature in 3D and obtain data about the length, connections, and complexity of microvessels. Vesselucida 360 is used in research fields such cancer, diabetes, strokes, and other conditions that affect microvasculature.  

ClearScope (2020): This is a light sheet theta microscope system invented by Dr. Raju Tomer at Columbia University and Dr. Raju Tomer. ClearScope allows researchers to image cleared tissue from large specimens. 

TissueScope is a whole slide scanner created in collaboration with Huron Digital Pathology.

Vesalius is a resonant scanning laser confocal system that allows 2D and 3D imaging for mounted and cleared tissue specimens.

References

External links 
 https://sbir.nih.gov/statistics/success-stories/mbf-bioscience

Biotechnology companies of the United States